Lekima may refer to four tropical cyclones in the Pacific Ocean. The name was contributed by Vietnam and refers to the lucuma tree.
 Typhoon Lekima (2001) (T0119, 23W, Labuyo) – in the 2001 season struck Taiwan and China
 Severe Tropical Storm Lekima (2007) (T0714, 16W, Hanna) in the 2007 season brought heavy rains to Luzon and struck Vietnam
 Typhoon Lekima (2013) (T1328, 28W) – the second strongest 2013 storm worldwide
 Typhoon Lekima (2019) (T1909, 10W, Hanna) – brought heavy rains and flooding to Luzon due to its enhancement of the southwest monsoon, later intensifying into the season's second super typhoon, and made landfall in China.

Due to the extensive damage and high death toll in South China caused by the 2019 storm, the name Lekima was retired by the ESCAP/WMO Typhoon Committee in February 2020. In 2021, the Typhoon Committee chose the name Co-may as a replacement name, which is the Vietnamese name for the plant, Chrysopogon aciculatus.

Pacific typhoon set index articles